Kilpisjärvi is a village in the municipality of Enontekiö, Lapland, Finland. It is located in Finland's northern "arm" near the very northwesternmost point of Finland.

Although Kilpisjärvi is one of the largest villages in Enontekiö, it is still quite small. In 2000 its population was recorded as 114. Like most Sami villages, Kilpisjärvi is built mainly around one major road,  Käsivarrentie, or the "Arm Road" and Neljäntuulentie, or the "Four Winds' Road" — also known as E8. Near Kilpisjärvi is the highest point of Finnish road network, at an elevation of 565.8 m.

Kilpisjärvi has its own school and a hotel, and the northernmost research station of the University of Helsinki is situated there, as well as the KAIRA research facility.

In the music video for Röyksopp's Poor Leno, Leno's place of origin is listed as Kilpisjärvi.

2015 school fire
The building of the Kilpisjärvi school burned down on 3 May 2015. It had been occupied by travellers at the time. The fire started from a recreational vehicle parked next to the building.

The fire destroyed thousands of euros worth of euro banknotes that had been stored at the school. The money had been collected as donations to fund a study trip for the school's pupils, but had been stored at the school because the school staff had been unable to find a bank office capable of depositing the money to the school's bank account. The nearest office of Nordea, where the school had an account, capable of depositing cash was in Rovaniemi, 440 km away from Kilpisjärvi. Nordea has pledged to donate 4000 euros to the school as reimbursement for the lost money.

Climate
Kilpisjärvi has a subarctic climate (Köppen climate classification: Dfc), with only two months above the 10 °C (50 °F) threshold. Summertime is typically cool and rainy with crisp nights. Winter is very long, cold, and snowy. It typically begins during October and lasts into May most years.

References

External links

 Kilpisjärvi tourist information
 Tundrea, Kilpisjarvi Holiday Resort
 Kilpisjärvi school
 Eskelisen Lapinlinjat, offering daily bus trips to and from Kilpisjärvi
 Kilpisjärvi travel guide
  Climatological statistics for the normal period 1981–2010 (PDF)

Villages in Finland
Enontekiö